XScreenSaver is a free and open-source collection of 240+
screensavers for Unix, macOS, iOS and Android operating systems. It was created by Jamie Zawinski in 1992 and is still maintained by him, with new releases coming out several times a year.

Platforms
The free software and open-source Unix-like operating systems running the X Window System (such as Linux and FreeBSD) use XScreenSaver almost exclusively. On those systems, there are several packages: one for the screen-saving and locking framework, and two or more for the display modes, divided somewhat arbitrarily.

On Macintosh systems, XScreenSaver works with the built-in macOS screen saver.

On iOS systems, XScreenSaver is a stand-alone app that can run any of the hacks full-screen.

On Android systems, the XScreenSaver display modes work either as normal screen savers (which Android sometimes refers to as "Daydreams") or as live wallpapers.

There is no official version for Microsoft Windows, and the developer discourages anyone from porting it. The author considers Microsoft to be "a company with vicious, predatory, anti-competitive business practices"
and says that, as one of the original authors of Netscape Navigator, he holds a "personal grudge" against Microsoft because of its behavior during the First Browser War.

Software Architecture 
The XScreenSaver daemon is responsible for detecting idle-ness, blanking and locking the screen, and launching the display modes.  The display modes (termed "hacks" from the historical usage "display hack") are each stand-alone programs.

This is an important security feature, in that the display modes are sandboxed into a separate process from the screen locking framework. This means that a programming error in one of the graphical display modes cannot compromise the screen locker itself (e.g., a crash in a display mode will not unlock the screen).

It also means that a third-party screen saver can be written in any language or with any graphics library, so long as it is capable of rendering onto an externally provided window.

For historical and portability reasons, the included hacks are all written in ANSI C. About half of them use the X11 API, and about half use the OpenGL 1.3 API.

Rather than forking the code-base and re-writing the hacks to target different platforms, XScreenSaver contains a number of compatibility layers.

 To allow the X11-based hacks to run natively on macOS and iOS, XScreenSaver contains a complete implementation of the X11 API built on top of Cocoa ("jwxyz").

 To allow the OpenGL 1.3-based hacks to run natively on iOS and Android systems, which only support OpenGL ES, XScreenSaver contains an implementation of the OpenGL 1.3 API built in top of OpenGL ES 1.0 ("jwzgles").
 And to allow the X11-based hacks to run natively on iOS and Android, XScreenSaver also contains an implementation of the X11 API in terms of OpenGL ES 1.0.

Security 
In addition to sandboxing the display modes, the XScreenSaver daemon links with as few libraries as possible. In particular, it does not link against GUI frameworks like GTK or KDE, but uses only raw Xlib for rendering the unlock dialog box.

In recent years, some Linux distributions have begun using the gnome-screensaver or kscreensaver screen-blanking frameworks by default instead of the framework included with XScreenSaver.
In 2011, gnome-screensaver was forked as both mate-screensaver and cinnamon-screensaver. Earlier versions of these frameworks still depended upon the XScreenSaver collection of screen savers, which is over 90% of the package.
However, in 2011, gnome-screensaver version 3 dropped support for screensavers completely, supporting only simple screen blanking,
and as of 2018, Linux Mint's cinnamon-screensaver 4.0.8 no longer supports the XScreenSaver hacks.

Those Linux distributions that have replaced XScreenSaver with other screen-locking frameworks have suffered notable security problems.  Those other frameworks have a history of security bugs that allow the screen to be un-locked without a password, e.g., by simply holding a key down until the locker crashes.

In 2004, Zawinski had written about the architectural decisions made in XScreenSaver with the goal of avoiding this very class of bug,

leading him to quip in 2015, "If you are not running XScreenSaver on Linux, then it is safe to assume that your screen does not lock."

Display Modes 
The included hacks are highly varied, ranging from simple 2D psychedelia, to 3D demonstrations of complex mathematical principles, to simulations of other computer systems, to re-creations of artifacts and effects from movies.

Though many of the newer hacks take full advantage of the power of modern computers, the age of the project means that some of the older hacks may look dated to modern eyes, as they were originally written for much less powerful computers.

Examples of hacks include:

Atlantis – an OpenGL animation showing whales and dolphins.
BSOD – shows fake fatal screen of death variants from many computer systems, including Microsoft Windows Blue Screen of Death, a Linux kernel panic, a Darwin crash, an Amiga "Guru Meditation" error, a sad Mac, and more.
Apple2 – simulates an Apple II computer, showing a user entering a simple BASIC program and running it. When run from the command-line, it is a fully functional terminal emulator (as is Phosphor.)
Barcode – a number of coloured barcodes scroll across the screen.
Flow – a 3D display of strange attractors.
Flying toasters – 3D toasters fly around, inspired by the classic After Dark screensaver.
Gears – an OpenGL animation of inter-meshing gears and planetary gears.
GLMatrix – an OpenGL animation similar to the "digital rain" title sequence seen in the Matrix trilogy.
Molecule – an OpenGL animation showing space-filling or ball-and-stick models of a series of common drugs and other molecules, of which thirty-eight (38) are built in. It can also read PDB (Protein Data Bank) from a file, or files placed in a directory, as input.
Penrose – tiles the screen aperiodically with coloured Penrose tiles.
Spotlight – puts a moving spotlight across the desktop in the style of the James Bond film opening sequences.
Sproingies – an animation in the style of the video game Q*bert.
Webcollage – creates collages out of random images found on the Web.
XAnalogTV – simulates an analog cathode ray tube television set, including visual artifacts and reception issues.
XPlanet – draws planets and other celestial bodies that update in real time.
XMatrix – animations similar to the "digital rain" sequence seen in the Matrix trilogy.

Some of the included hacks are very similar to demo effects created by the demoscene:
 Boing – based on the 1984 program regarded as the first Amiga demo ever, showing the bouncing red and white ball.
 Bumps – an implementation of full-screen 2D bump mapping.
 Metaballs – another common demo effect.
 Moire2 – moving interference circles similar to those common in older Amiga demos.
 ShadeBobs – another effect common in older Amiga demos.
 XFlame – the filter-based fire effect, also known as flame effect.

See also 
XScreenSaver was featured in Sleep Mode: The Art of the Screensaver,
a gallery exhibition curated by Rafaël Rozendaal at Rotterdam's Het Nieuwe Instituut in 2017.

References

External links 
 
 
 

Screensavers
Utilities for macOS
X Window programs